A Bachelor of Independent Studies is an undergraduate academic degree.  Its program of studies is unique to each student, and the individual curricula are largely determined by each student.  It may focus in any field, and generally has two phases: a pre-thesis phase, in which the student takes courses or reading courses, and a thesis phase, in which the student completes a substantial thesis.  A similarly name Bachelor of Interdisciplinary Studies is also awarded by some universities.  The degree can be considered akin to a degree in general studies and is becoming increasingly popular in the United States. The Bachelor of Independent Studies targets adult learners previously unable to complete their educational pursuits, through transfer credit options and interdisciplinary concentrations tailored to each student.

While it is an undergraduate degree, it is far more akin in structure to a graduate degree. The state of Florida has developed an external degree program for the BIS degree; Florida International University, Florida State University, the University of Florida, the University of North Florida, and the University of South Florida all participate. In Kentucky, Murray State University now offers a BIS program as well. Several other colleges are beginning to offer degrees that are very similar to or identical with the BIS program, such as the University of Northern Iowa and its Bachelor of Liberal Studies program, or Brigham Young University's Bachelor of General Studies program. George Mason University's BIS degree includes Early Childhood Education and calls it the Bachelor of Individualized Studies.

List of institutions awarding Bachelor of Independent Studies degrees

 George Mason University, Fairfax, Virginia
 University of Waterloo, Waterloo, Ontario, Canada This degree was inactivated in September, 2016, after being offered for 30 years, due to a decline in demand for the degree option. 
 James Madison University, Harrisonburg, Virginia
 Murray State University, Murray, Kentucky
 University of South Florida, Tampa Bay, Florida
 New Mexico State University, Las Cruces, New Mexico
 Weber State University, Ogden, Utah
 Fairleigh Dickinson University, Teaneck, New Jersey
 Edinboro University, Edinboro, Pennsylvania
 Hong Kong University of Science and Technology, the programme is named as BSc in Individualized Interdisciplinary Major Program (IIM)

List of institutions awarding Bachelor of Interdisciplinary Studies degrees

 Georgia State University, Atlanta, Georgia
 Arizona State University, Tempe, Arizona
 Emporia State University, Emporia, Kansas
 Jones College, Jacksonville, Florida
 Louisiana State University, Baton Rouge, Louisiana
 Missouri Western State University, Saint Joseph, Missouri
 University of New Orleans, New Orleans, Louisiana
 University of North Alabama, Florence, Alabama
 UNC Pembroke, North Carolina
 University of South Alabama, Mobile, Alabama
 University of Southern Mississippi, Hattiesburg, Mississippi 
 Southern University, Baton Rouge, Louisiana
 Southern Utah University, Cedar City, Utah
 Stevenson University, Owings Mills, Maryland
 Western Kentucky University, Bowling Green, Kentucky
 Winston Salem State University, Winston-Salem, North Carolina
 Hong Kong University of Science and Technology, the programme is named as BSc in Individualized Interdisciplinary Major Program (IIM)

See also
Bachelor of Integrated Studies
Bachelor of General Studies
Bachelor of Liberal Studies

References

Independent Studies